T-116 was a minesweeper of the Soviet Navy during World War II and the Cold War. Upon completion she was transferred to the Soviet Union under Lend-Lease as T-116; she was never returned to the United States. The ship was renamed several times in Soviet service and was scrapped on 4 May 1963. Because of the Cold War, the U.S. Navy was unaware of this fate and the vessel remained on the American Naval Vessel Register until she was struck on 1 January 1983.

Career 
Arcade was laid down on 8 June 1942 at Tampa, Florida, by the Tampa Shipbuilding Co.; launched on 7 December 1942; sponsored by Miss V. Zoll; and completed on 26 August 1943. She was transferred to the Soviet Navy that same day as T-116. She was never returned to U.S. custody.

On 5 September 1944, while on patrol in Kara Sea, T-116 attacked and sunk with depth charges the German submarine U-362.

In Soviet service the ship was renamed TB-23 on 11 July 1956, and SM-7 on 23 October 1962. The ship was eventually scrapped on 4 May 1963.

Due to the ongoing Cold War, the U.S. Navy was unaware of this fate. They had reclassified the vessel as MSF-143 on 7 February 1955, and kept her on the American Naval Vessel Register until she was struck on 1 January 1983.

References

External links
 NavSource Online: Mine Warfare Vessel Photo Archive – Arcade (MSF 143) – ex-AM-143 – ex-AMc-120

Admirable-class minesweepers
Ships built in Tampa, Florida
1942 ships
World War II minesweepers of the United States
Admirable-class minesweepers of the Soviet Navy
World War II minesweepers of the Soviet Union
Cold War minesweepers of the Soviet Union